In ethics, the plank of Carneades is a thought experiment first proposed by the Academic Skeptic philosopher Carneades of Cyrene. It explores the concept of self-defense in relation to murder.

In the thought experiment, there are two shipwrecked sailors, A and B.  They both see a plank that can only support one of them and both of them swim towards it.  Sailor A gets to the plank first.  Sailor B, who is going to drown, pushes A off and away from the plank and, thus, proximately, causes A to drown.  Sailor B gets on the plank and is later saved by a rescue team. The thought experiment poses the question of whether Sailor B can be tried for murder because if B had to kill A in order to live, then it would arguably be in self-defense.

The Case of the Speluncean Explorers by legal philosopher Lon Fuller is a similar exploration of morality and legality in extremis.

See also
Consequentialism
Deontology
Duress
Necessity
Principle of double effect
Trolley problem

References
 Cicero, De officiis 3.89.
 Lactantius, Divinae institutiones 16.10.

Thought experiments in ethics
Academic skepticism